Seikhohau Tuboi (born 1989) is an Indian football player. He played for Shillong Lajong FC in the I-League as a striker. Currently he plays for Manipur-based F.C. Zalen.

References

External links
 Goal.com profile

Indian footballers
1989 births
Living people
People from Imphal
I-League players
Footballers from Manipur
Shillong Lajong FC players
Association football forwards